Anninsky (masculine), Anninskaya (feminine), or Anninskoye (neuter) is the name of several rural localities in Russia:
Anninsky (rural locality), a pochinok in Smetaninsky Rural Okrug of Sanchursky District of Kirov Oblast
Anninskoye, Pskov Oblast, a village in Sebezhsky District of Pskov Oblast
Anninskoye, Tver Oblast, a village in Lukinskoye Rural Settlement of Sandovsky District of Tver Oblast
Anninskoye, Vologda Oblast, a village in Komyansky Selsoviet of Gryazovetsky District of Vologda Oblast
Anninskaya, a village in Staronadezhdinsky Selsoviet of Blagoveshchensky District of the Republic of Bashkortostan